The Cariboo Heart Range is a subrange of the Hogem Ranges of the Omineca Mountains, located between Ominicetla Creek and Lion Creek in northern British Columbia, Canada.

References

Cariboo Heart Range in the Canadian Mountain Encyclopedia

Omineca Mountains